The Conneaut School District is a public school district in Crawford County, Pennsylvania and geographically encompasses approximately the western third of the county. The School District comprises the Boroughs of Conneaut Lake, Conneautville, Linesville and Springboro; and the Townships of Beaver, Conneaut, East Fallowfield, Greenwood, North Shenango, Pine, Sadsbury, Spring, Summerhill, Summit and West Fallowfield. The School District can be classified as rural with the majority of the work force employed in area contiguous to that of the School District.

Attendance Areas
The Conneaut School District comprises three separate attendance areas: Linesville, Conneaut Lake and Conneaut Valley. Each attendance area represents a small diverse community. Linesville is a small community located near the Pennsylvania and Ohio state line. It is a close-knit community. Many tourist visit Linesville because of the town's proximity to Pymatuning Lake. Conneaut Lake is a resort town on the shores of Conneaut Lake. Tourism flourishes here particularly during summer months. Conneaut Valley represents the community of Conneautville and Springboro, small towns in the north-central part of the school district. The Conneaut Valley community is also centered in a predominantly agricultural area of Crawford County.

Schools

In 2012, the Conneaut School District Board of Education voted to reconfigure its school buildings and realign its attendance areas in order to cut costs and more efficiently serve its students. The board voted to have 2 elementary schools, 2 middle schools and one senior high school to serve the district. Prior to reconfiguration, the district had 3 elementary schools and 3 junior-senior high schools. All of the district's buildings will be used in the reconfiguration.

An Administration Building, located on the Linesville campus, houses the district's central office staff. The six schools and the Administration Building have been extensively renovated since 2000.

Elementary schools

Middle schools

Note: The Conneaut Lake Middle School and Conneaut Valley Middle School are located in the former buildings that used to house the former Conneaut Lake High School and Conneaut Valley High School, respectively.

Senior High School

Note: The Conneaut Area Senior High School is located in the former buildings that used to house the former Linesville High School and Alice Shafer Elementary School (now Alice L. Schafer Annex) located on the same campus in Linesville, PA.

Extracurriculars 
Conneaut School District offers a variety of clubs, activities and sports programs.

Sports 
The district sponsors the following high school sports as of PIAA District 10.
Boys:
Baseball (AAAA)
Basketball (AAAA)
Cross Country (AA)
Football (AAA)
Golf (AA)
Lacrosse (AA)
Soccer (AA)
Volleyball (AA)
Wrestling (AA)Girls:
Basketball (AAAA)
Cross Country (AA)
Golf (AA)
Lacrosse (AA)
Soccer (AA)
Softball (AAAA)
Volleyball (AAA)The district sponsors the following middle school sports.
Boys
Basketball
Cross Country
Football
Volleyball
WrestlingGirls
Basketball
Cross Country
Volleyball

References

External links 

 Official website

School districts in Crawford County, Pennsylvania
School districts established in 2012